William Bradford (May 20, 1663 – May 23, 1752) was an early American colonial printer and publisher in British America. Bradford is best known for establishing the first printing press in the Middle colonies of the Thirteen Colonies, founding the first press in Pennsylvania in 1685 and the first press in New York in 1693. Bradford operated continuously printing establishments for sixty-two years, heading a family that would include printers and publishers for 140 years. He was also known for controversies regarding freedom of the press. Starting his printing career in London, Bradford emigrated to America in 1685. He established, with others, the first paper mill to appear in the Thirteen American Colonies.

Throughout his career, Bradford printed and published thousands of titles. In addition to his print shops in the province of Pennsylvania, the province of New York, the province of New Jersey, he also had five different locations in New York City. Printing almanacs, newspapers, books, pamphlets, broadsides, blank forms, paper money, legal documents, colonial laws, and religious material, Bradford was also the public printer for the province of New York and province of New Jersey.

Early life

William Bradford was born on May 20, 1663, to William and Ann Bradford in the village of Barwell in Leicestershire, England. His father was a printer and farmer. He was baptized at the local Anglican parish church, as was required by law, and the Barwell Parish Church baptismal records show May 30, 1663. According to historian Alexander James Wall of the New York Historical Society his parents, however, were likely members of the Religious Society of Friends (Quakers). His father died when he was four years old.

Bradford apprenticed outside the family to learn a trade, as was customary at the time. His trainer was Andrew Sowel (some sources spell Sowle or Sorole), the foremost Quaker printer in London, who printed in the Crooked Billet in Holloway Lane at Shoreditch. Bradford started working for Sowel around 1680 and, by December 3, 1684, he had mastered the trade and was freed from his apprenticeship. Bradford married Sowel's eldest daughter, Elizabeth, on April 28, 1685. Sowel arranged for the two to join William Penn in his new colony in North America with a letter of recommendation from George Fox, founder of the Quakers, to become the colonial printer. The couple sailed to America four months after they were married.

Mid life

William and Elizabeth Bradford arrived in America sometime in November 1685 and settled at a location near where Philadelphia was eventually laid out. Bradford then established Pennsylvania's first printing press, likely in the Chester or Burlington area. His first publication was an almanac, Kalendarium Pennsilvaniense compiled by Samuel Atkins, Student in the Mathamaticks and Astrology. Bradford advertised it as available to purchase near Philadelphia in Pennsilvania on December 28, 1685. The almanac was sometimes also known as America's Messenger, Being an Almanack for Year of Grace 1686. It contained both American news and British news.

Bradford wrote an introduction in the almanac of "The Printer to the Readers" describing his new printing business he had just set up. In it he apologized for any printing errors the readers may find in the almanac, as that was caused by his difficult traveling that had produced disorder and confusion in the transporting of his typesetting characters used in his printing press, but hoped that readers would appreciate the hard work he underwent in order to bring printed material to the Middle Colonies. The almanac publication received immediate attention, especially from the Quakers and Pennsylvania Governor William Penn who took offense at a reference to him as "Lord Penn," communicating clearly to Bradford that those words were to be taken out. Atkins was quickly reprimanded for the incident and Bradford was told not to print anything unless it was approved by the Pennsylvania Provincial Assembly council.

Bradford later published An Almanack for year of the Christian account 1687 compiled by Daniel Leeds, student of agriculture, the oldest of his publications with a known date. The 1687 sheet almanac that he sold came with twelve sections that began traditionally with March and went to February of the next year. At the bottom of the sheets was an explanation of the pages, an account of the eclipses for the year, and some rules in husbandry. The Monthly Meeting at Philadelphia directed Bradford to collect all copies that he had just printed and destroy them as the publication had paragraphs that were offensive to the Quakers. He did this and was compensated for the copies and his labor. In 1688, he printed Temple of Wisdom, the first full-sized book released in the middle colonies.

Bradford was living in Philadelphia by 1689 and had established a bookstore. He published a booklet in 1689 composed by Quaker missionary George Keith titled The Presbyterian and Independent Visible Churches in New England.  Historian Isaiah Thomas owned a copy of the book that he claimed was the oldest known book printed in Philadelphia. According to book dealer historian William S. Reese, it is the one of the first books printed in America.  In that year Joseph Growdon, a member of the Pennsylvania Provincial Assembly council, hired Bradford to print William Penn's original charter for the province. The new Pennsylvania governor John Blackwell was outraged and reprimanded him. Bradford argued that he printed what he received. He claimed in his account of the incident that he was not liable for publishing as he did not compose it and that he was not bound to testify against himself. This incident was an early test of freedom of the press in the Middle Colonies. In reprimanding the publishing of the original charter, authorities attempted to deny the people of Pennsylvania knowledge of the rights and privileges afforded them under their laws.

 
In 1690, Bradford, partnered with a newly arrived German paper maker, William Rittenhouse, and several merchants, and established the first paper mill in America along a creek in Roxborough, Pennsylvania. He had his doubts about this undertaking at first and was not a steady customer of the products of the mill because he had not received the newspaper nor book business he thought he would get from the Quakers. He had sent his wife and two infant sons to England and was making preparations to follow, to become the replacement printer for Sowel who had died, with plans to take over his business there. At that time, there was the beginnings of disagreements among the Philadelphia Quakers, which was followed by the Yearly Meeting to grant Bradford a yearly salary and as much business they could throw his way to induce him to remain in the colonies. For further enticement, the 1691 Yearly Meeting agreed that all books printed for the Quakers were to come with a minimum 200 copy order. This, along with other enticements, motivated him to stay and recall his family from England. It wasn't until he had moved to New York later did he have enough business to contract with the managing partners of the paper mill to get preferential terms on products. The mill was the only paper manufacturer in the Thirteen Colonies until 1710.  It was followed by hundreds of paper mills constructed in the United States by 1832.

Bradford is best known as the founder of the first printing press in the Middle colonies of the Thirteen Colonies. In 1692, he printed thirteen of Keith's writings, including An Appeal from the Twenty-Eight Judges to Spirit of Truth, which the authorities construed as rebellious against the local government. Bradford was arrested, tried, and jailed for printing without a trade name imprint, a violation of the Licensing Act of 1662. This was America's first trial regarding freedom of the press. His press and type letters were seized and he was imprisoned for a four-month time that ended in an inconclusive trial December 1692 due to Bradford's own persuasive skills in court. He had his equipment and type returned to him through the intervention of New York governor Benjamin Fletcher. He then printed three works over the next few months, all without a printer's name or place of publication. One of note was the first book in New York City, "New-England Persecution Transmitted to Pennsylvania" authored by Keith and with some words in Hebrew type.

Bradford, in April 1693, accepted an invitation of governor Fletcher to become the official public printer for the province of New York, then an Anglo-Dutch village. His first official publication with his trade mark imprint is deemed the broadside Proclamation printed from his press on June 8, 1693. Another broadside he printed in 1693 was Catalogue of Fees was his first protest against keeping slaves. Another was a structured work composed by Fletcher titled A journal of the Late Actions of the French. A book of note was one authored by Keith called Truth Advanced printed in March or April 1694. This was followed that year by The Laws & Acts of the General Assembly for Their Majesties Province of New York, King William and Queen Mary, being first book he published in New York. Bradford said that his printing house was at the sign of the Bible.Bradford first lived on Pearl Street in downtown Manhattan in New York City, then moved to the Stone Street location in 1698 where his offices were located in Hanover Square. He ultimately resided in five different locations in New York City. Bradford's printing office published session laws, almanacs, and religious material. A publication of note that Bradford printed in 1715 was the American Book of Common Prayer in the Mohawk language, which was also known as the Mohawk Prayer Book, that was for the use by missionaries. He was the governor's only printer in the province of New York for three decades until 1723. He began publishing their first newspaper, the New-York Gazette in 1725, which was published weekly.

Bradford was appointed public printer of New Jersey in 1703, which was a post held concurrently with his New York position. He became clerk for the New Jersey Assembly in 1710. He was in this post until 1718 and paid a salary of between $3,750 and $5,640 (equivalent 2019 US dollars) progressively through the years. Soon after he had become clerk, he received a temporary appointment with John Johnson and Joseph Billop as commissioners for the office of Treasurer of New Jersey. Another source of income he had was from 1716 to 1721 as a tax collector for New Jersey on alcoholic spirits of beer, rum, brandy, wine, and hard cider.

 Later life and death 
Bradford published the first number of the New-York Gazette on October 16, 1725, the first newspaper printed in the province of New York. Bradford remained as publisher of the New-York Gazette, printing it until he retired. In 1727, he took James Parker as an apprentice for an eight-year term.  In 1731, Bradford's first wife died and afterwards he married a widow named Smith. In 1734, his former apprentice, John Peter Zenger, was brought to court for libel, but Bradford remained out of the case. 

Bradford retired at the age of 80 in 1743 as printer of the New York Gazette and lived his last years with his son William. Henry De Foreest, an apprentice Bradford trained, took over his business when he retired. Bradford declined in health and died at the age of 89 at his son's house on May 23, 1752. He is interred in the Trinity Churchyard Cemetery on Wall Street in Manhattan where his tombstone still stands reading:

Bradford family printing legacy
Bradford's wife Elizabeth gave birth to their first child, Andrew in 1686, who, along with his wife Cornelia Smith Bradford, were early American printers. Andrew published the first newspaper in colonial Philadelphia. William Jr, the brother of Andrew, was a printer and seaman. Bradford's grandson, William Bradford became a well-known printer during the American Revolution for the Continental Congress. The Bradford Family Papers (1620–1906) are deposited at the Historical Society of Pennsylvania. Bradford established printing and publishing businesses that operated for 140 years from 1685 until 1825. He trained several apprentices that including John Peter Zenger, James Parker, Henry DeForest, and his son Andrew Bradford. Andrew's family continued working in the printing and publishing industry for four generations.

Bradford published New York City's first law book (1694), the first published proceedings of an American legislature (New York City, 1695), the first province of New York paper currency (1709), the first Book of Common Prayer (1706) in America, the first history of the province of New York (1727), New York City's first newspaper (1725), and the first copperplate plan for New York City (1730).

 See also 
 Early American publishers and printers
Other early American publishers and printers:

 David Hall (publisher)
 William Goddard (publisher)
 John Holt (publisher)

References

Bibliography

 

 
 
 

 
 
 
 

Further reading
 E. B. Bronner & D.Fraser, William Penn's published writings, 1660–1726: an interpretive bibliography (1986)

 H.Amory & D. D.Hall, eds., The colonial book in the Atlantic world (2000)

 A. J. DeArmond, Andrew Bradford: colonial journalist (1949)

 D. F. McKenzie, ed., Stationers' Company apprentices, [2]: 1641–1700 (1974)

 C. W. Miller, Benjamin Franklin's Philadelphia printing, 1728–1766: a descriptive bibliography (1974)

 R. S. Mortimer, ‘The first century of Quaker printers’, Journal of the Friends' Historical Society'', 40 (1948), 37–49; 41 (1949), 78–84

  -- alternative Google link

 Steven J. Shaw. Colonial Newspaper Advertising: A Step toward Freedom of the Press. The Business History Review, Vol. 33, No. 3 (Autumn, 1959), pp. 409–420

 Catherine Tourangeau, "It Runs in the Family: The Bradfords, Print, and Liberty(1680-1810)" (Universite de Montreal, M.A. Thesis, 2013)

External links

1663 births
1752 deaths
People from Barwell
English printers
American printers
English emigrants
People of the Province of New York
Burials at Trinity Church Cemetery
People of colonial Pennsylvania
18th-century American newspaper publishers (people)
Colonial American printers